Matthew Darren Evans (born 11 April 1981), known professionally as Matt Ryan, is a Welsh actor. He is known for portraying Edward Kenway in the Ubisoft video game Assassin's Creed IV: Black Flag, and John Constantine in NBC's Constantine and The CW's Arrowverse, as well as voicing the character in the DC Animated Movie Universe and its CW spin-off web series Constantine: City of Demons.

Early life
Ryan was born in Swansea as Matthew Darren Evans, the son of Steve and Maria Evans.

He attended schools in Penyrheol before moving on to Gorseinon College, where he completed a BTEC Performing Arts course. He graduated from the Bristol Old Vic in 2003 and joined the Royal Shakespeare Company in 2004.

Career
When he was 10, Ryan appeared as Gavroche in the West End production of Les Misérables. He played Mick Rawson on the CBS series Criminal Minds: Suspect Behavior, a character that had been introduced in the Criminal Minds episode "The Fight".

He performed the voice and motion capture of Edward Kenway in Ubisoft Montreal's video game Assassin's Creed IV: Black Flag. In February 2014, it was announced that Ryan was cast as John Constantine in NBC's pilot for Constantine. He starred in all 13 episodes of the series' only season. He reprised his role in a crossover episode of The CW's Arrow, as well as the 2017 animated film Justice League Dark. On 8 January 2017,  The CW announced an animated series of Constantine: City of Demons on the CW Seed app with Ryan confirmed to reprise the character. He later reprised the role in several episodes of the third season of Legends of Tomorrow. Ryan was promoted to series regular for the fourth season of Legends of Tomorrow.

In the 2015 production of Helen Edmundson's adaptation of Thérèse Raquin at the Roundabout Theater at Studio 54 he played Laurent opposite Keira Knightley, Judith Light, and Gabriel Ebert.

In August 2017, he appeared on stage at the Donmar Warehouse in the play Knives in Hens by David Harrower and directed by Yaël Farber.

Filmography

Film

Television

Theatre

Video games

Notes

References

External links

Matt Ryan podcast

1981 births
Alumni of Bristol Old Vic Theatre School
Living people
Welsh expatriates in the United States
Welsh male film actors
Welsh male television actors
21st-century Welsh male actors
Welsh male voice actors
Welsh male video game actors
Welsh male stage actors
Male actors from Swansea
Royal Shakespeare Company members
Welsh male Shakespearean actors